The D. H. Lawrence Birthplace Museum is a writer's home museum dedicated to the writer D. H. Lawrence situated in Eastwood, near Nottingham.
It is the house in which he was born in 1885, and one of the four houses the family occupied in Eastwood. Now a museum, visitors can visit the building via guided or self-guided tour.

The exhibition
Visitors enter the Museum through the house next door, through the Museum shop.

The house has been laid out in the style of a late 19th-century working-class miner's house, with the furniture being mostly from the family of the women who founded it, Enid Goodband, first curator of the museum . There are a few original items from Lawrence's family; the artefacts are as close to the 1880s as possible and from Nottinghamshire to make the contents as authentic for the period. The house is set out as it was thought to have been when the Lawrences lived there. The significance of each room (parlour, kitchen, communal yard, washhouse, parents’ bedroom, children's bedroom and attic) is highlighted, either by the interpretation boards on display, or via a staff member on a guided tour.

There is a small exhibition of Lawrence's early original watercolour paintings and a DVD room that starts the tour providing an introduction to his life in Eastwood and thereafter. Photocopies of his later paintings are also displayed. A recent addition to the collection was Lawrence's original gravestone, which has been on display since 11 September 2009—the anniversary of his birthday.

Heritage Centre

Prior to 2016, the Broxtowe Borough Council also supported the nearby D. H. Lawrence Heritage Centre (also known as Durban House Heritage Centre), which contained exhibitions about the social history of Eastwood and other facilities.  In 2015, the Council voted to close the building and merge the Centre with the Birthplace Museum as a money-saving measure. The centre contained an exhibition on the social history of Eastwood during the time that the writer lived there, including information on the educational system, mining, trams, retail along with D. H. Lawrence and the people who were affiliated with him. In addition there was an art gallery, a bistro, conference rooms, civil wedding, funeral, birthday and education facilities.

References

Bibliography
Retrieved: 10.10.2009
Retrieved: 10.10.2009
10.10.2009 
Retrieved: 24.09.2009

External links
D. H. Lawrence Birthplace Museum—with visiting information about the museum

Birthplace Museum
Lawrence
Historic house museums in Nottinghamshire
Literary museums in England
Eastwood, Nottinghamshire
Lawrence, D. H.